Murada is a rural locality (a selo) and the administrative centre of Darada-Muradinsky Selsoviet, Gergebilsky District, Republic of Dagestan, Russia. The population was 1,560 as of 2010. There are 14 streets.

Geography 
Murada is located 17 km southwest of Gergebil (the district's administrative centre) by road. Khvartikuni and Maali are the nearest rural localities.

References 

Rural localities in Gergebilsky District